Robléu de Teinás is one of 54 parish councils in Cangas del Narcea, a municipality within the province and autonomous community of Asturias, in northern Spain.

Its villages include:  Castieḷḷu, Zreizalí, Chanos, Parada la Viecha, Porciles, Robléu de Teinás and Teinás.

References 

Parishes in Cangas del Narcea